Poropterus gemmifer is a species of true weevil family.

Description
The basic colour is black or brown. The elytra and the pronotum are covered by small glossy tubercles.

Distribution
This species can be found in New Guinea.

References 

 Universal Biological Indexer
 Global Species
 Bishop Museum

Molytinae
Beetles described in 1885
Taxa named by Francis Polkinghorne Pascoe